is a Japanese archer. He competed in the 2000 Summer Olympics, and the 2004 Summer Olympics.

External links
Player profile
2004 Japan Olympic Committee

1979 births
Archers at the 2000 Summer Olympics
Japanese male archers
Living people
Olympic archers of Japan
Sportspeople from Saga Prefecture
21st-century Japanese people